Anne Alexandra Lawrence (born November 17, 1950) is an American psychologist, sexologist, and former anesthesiologist who has published extensively on transsexuality.

Work
Lawrence is a proponent of Ray Blanchard's transsexualism typology theory and self-identifies as an autogynephilic transsexual. She has proposed that autogynephilia is not only sexual in nature, but also encompasses elements of romantic love. Lawrence is a member of the American Medical Association and the International Academy of Sex Research and serves on the board of directors of the Society for the Scientific Study of Sexuality. She lives in Seattle, Washington, where she formerly maintained a private practice in sex therapy.

Lawrence was a coauthor on the 2002 Harry Benjamin International Gender Dysphoria Association's Standards of Care for Gender Identity Disorders, Sixth Version (now the World Professional Association for Transgender Health (WPATH) Standards of Care).

Selected publications

Books

Papers

See also
 J. Michael Bailey

References

External links
 Anne A. Lawrence, M.D., Ph.D. -- Practice Information
 Dr. Anne Lawrence - Publications and Presentations
 Dr. Anne Lawrence - Curriculum Vitae

21st-century American psychologists
American women psychologists
American sexologists
American LGBT scientists
21st-century American non-fiction writers
21st-century American women writers
American science writers
Women science writers
American medical writers
Women medical writers
American anesthesiologists
LGBT physicians
Transgender women
Transgender scientists
Institute for Advanced Study of Human Sexuality alumni
Argosy University alumni
University of Minnesota alumni
University of Chicago alumni
1950 births
Living people
21st-century LGBT people
20th-century American psychologists
Women anesthesiologists
American transgender writers